The Shaishunaga dynasty (IAST: Śaiśunāga, literally "of Shishunaga") is the fourth ruling dynasty of Magadha, an empire of ancient India. According to the Hindu Puranas, this dynasty was the second ruling dynasty of Magadha, succeeding Nagadashaka of the Haryanka dynasty.

Shishunaga, the founder of the dynasty, was initially an amatya or "minister" of the last Haryanka dynasty ruler Nāgadāsaka and ascended to the throne after a popular rebellion in c. 413 BCE. The capital of this dynasty initially was Vaishali; but later shifted to Pataliputra, near the present day Patna, during the reign of Kalashoka. According to tradition, Kalashoka was succeeded by his ten sons. This dynasty was succeeded by the Nanda Empire in c. 345 BCE.

Establishment
According to Buddhist tradition, Shishunaga was amatya in Haryanka kingdom, who revolted and became the king.

Rulers

Shishunaga

Shishunaga founded his dynasty in 413 BCE with its capital in Rajgir and later Pataliputra (both in what is now Bihar). Buddhist sources indicate that he had a secondary capital at Vaishali, formerly the capital of Vajji, until it was conquered by Magadha. The Shaishunaga dynasty ruled one of the largest empires in the Indian subcontinent. Most important achievement of Shisunga was destruction of the Pradyota dynasty of Avanti. This brought to an end the hundred year old rivalry between Magadh and Avanti. From then Avanti became a part of Magadh.

Kakavarna/Kalashoka

According to the Puranas, Shishunaga was succeeded by his son Kakavarna and according to the Sinhala chronicles by his son Kalashoka. On the basis of the evidence of the Ashokavadana, Hermann Jacobi, Wilhelm Geiger and Ramakrishna Gopal Bhandarkar concluded that both are the same. During Shishunaga's reign, he was the governor of Varanasi. The two most significant events of his reign are the Second Buddhist council at Vaishali in 383 BC and the final transfer of the capital to Pataliputra. According to the Harshacharita, he was killed by a dagger thrust into his throat in the vicinity of his capital. According to Buddhist tradition, he had nine or ten sons, who were ousted by Ugrasena Nanda.

Later rulers
According to Buddhist tradition, ten sons of Kalashoka ruled simultaneously. The Mahabodhivamsa states their names as Bhadrasena, Korandavarna, Mangura, Sarvanjaha, Jalika, Ubhaka, Sanjaya, Koravya, Nandivardhana and Panchamaka. Only one of them is mentioned in the Puranic lists, Nandivardhana.

The Puranas list Nandivardhana as the ninth Shaishunaga king and his son Mahanandin as the tenth and the last Shaishunaga king. Mahanandin was killed by Mahapadma, his illegitimate son from a Shudra wife.

Decline
According to Puranas, Shaishunagas were followed by Nanda Empire, which was established by Mahanandin's son Mahapadma Nanda.

References

Citations

Sources
 
 
 
 
 

Magadha
History of Bihar
5th-century BC establishments in India
4th-century BC disestablishments in India
Kingdoms of Bihar